Marquis of Viana (in Portuguese Marquês de Viana) was a Portuguese title of nobility granted on July 3, 1821, John VI of Portugal to D. João Manoel de Menezes, who already was 2nd Count of Viana, a son of Domingos Manoel de Noronha, 3rd Marquess of Tancos.

List of the Marquesses of Viana (1821)
 João Manoel de Menezes (1783–1831), 2nd Count of Viana;
 João Paulo Manoel de Menezes (1810–1890), 3rd Count of Viana.

See also
Count of Viana
List of marquesses in Portugal

External links
Genealogy of the Marquesses of Viana, in Portuguese

Bibliography
"Nobreza de Portugal e Brasil" Vol III, pages 48/481. Published by Zairol, Lda., Lisbon, 1989.

Portuguese nobility
Marquisates